Soloba is a village and seat of the rural commune of Yallankoro-Soloba in the Cercle of Yanfolila in the Sikasso Region of southern Mali. The village is 32 km west of Yanfolila and 4 km from the Sankarani River that marks the border with Guinea. It is the birthplace of photographer Malick Sidibé.

References

Populated places in Sikasso Region